The Happiest Man in the World is an album by American folk punk musician Hamell on Trial, released on February 25, 2014, on New West Records.

Critical reception

American Songwriters Hal Horowitz gave The Happiest Man in the World 3.5 out of 4 stars, describing it as "a powerful and revealing introduction to a guy whose full talents can only be experienced in concerts where he really lets loose". Mark Deming of AllMusic wrote, "As Joe Strummer told us, anger can be power, and Hamell on Trial still has a full tank of the stuff cut with some snarky but potent humor, and it fuels The Happiest Man in the World very well indeed."

Track listing
"Artist in America" —	6:06
"Happiest Man in the World" —	5:52
"Bobby and the Russians" —	3:49
"Global Tattoo" —	4:11
"Together" —	2:49
"Ain't That Love?" —	3:36
"Lappa Oo Mau Mau" —	4:31
"Richard's Got a Job" —	2:18
"Whores" —	2:18
"Jennifer's Stripping Again" —	3:07
"Mom's Hot" —	2:40
"Blessed" —	3:45

References

2014 albums
Hamell on Trial albums
New West Records albums